Vamorolone (developmental code name VBP-15) is a synthetic steroid, which is under development for the treatment of Duchenne muscular dystrophy.

Anti-inflammatory drugs of the corticosteroid class show a carbonyl (=O) or hydroxyl (-OH) group on the C11 carbon of the steroid backbone.  In contrast, vamorolone contains a delta9,11 double bond between the C9 and C11 carbons. This change in structure has been shown to remove a molecular contact site with the glucocorticoid receptor, and lead to dissociative properties. Vamorolone is a partial agonist of the glucocorticoid receptor (NR3C1) with relative loss of transactivation activities, but retention of transrepression activities, compared to corticosteroidal drugs.  In contrast to drugs of the corticosteroid class, vamorolone is a potent antagonist of the mineralocorticoid receptor (NR3C2).

In Phase 1 clinical trials of adult volunteers, vamorolone was shown to be safe and well tolerated, with blood biomarker data suggesting possible loss of safety concerns of the corticosteroid class

In Phase 2a dose-ranging clinical trial of 48 children with Duchenne muscular dystrophy (2 weeks on drug, 2 weeks off drug), vamorolone was shown to be safe and well tolerated, and showed blood biomarker data consistent with a myofiber membrane stabilization and anti-inflammatory effects, and possible loss of safety concerns.  These children continued on to a 24-week open-label extension study at the same doses, and this showed dose-dependent improvement of motor outcomes, with 2.0 and 6.0 mg/kg/day suggesting benefit.  These same children continued on a long-term extension study with dose escalations, and this suggested continued clinical improvement through 18-months treatment.

Population pharmacokinetics (PK) of vamorolone was shown to fit to a 1-compartment model with zero-order absorption, with both adult men and young boys showing dose-linearity of PK parameters for the doses examined, and no accumulation of the drug during daily dosing. Apparent clearance averaged 2.0 L/h/kg in men and 1.7 L/h/kg in boys. Overall, vamorolone exhibited well-behaved linear PK, with similar profiles in healthy men and boys with DMD, moderate variability in PK parameters, and absorption and disposition profiles similar to those of classical glucocorticoids.  Exposure/response analyses have suggested that the motor outcome of time to stand from supine velocity showed the highest sensitivity to vamorolone, with the lowest AUC value providing 50% of maximum effect (E50 = 186 ng·h/mL), followed by time to climb 4 stairs (E50 = 478 ng·h/mL), time to run/walk 10 m (E50 = 1220 ng·h/mL), and 6-minute walk test (E50 = 1770 ng·h/mL). Week 2 changes of proinflammatory PD biomarkers showed exposure-dependent decreases. The E50 was 260 ng·h/mL for insulin-like growth factor-binding protein 2, 1200 ng·h/mL for matrix metalloproteinase 12, 1260 ng·h/mL for lymphotoxin α1/β2, 1340 ng·h/mL for CD23, 1420 ng·h/mL for interleukin-22-binding protein, and 1600 ng·h/mL for macrophage-derived chemokine/C-C motif chemokine 22.

References

External links 
 Vamorolone - ReveraGen BioPharma

Diketones
Diols
Glucocorticoids
Pregnanes